An ulu is an Inuit cutting knife.

Ulu may also refer to:

People
Sue Ulu (born 1963), American voice actor
Ulu Grosbard (born 1929), theater and film director and film producer

Places
Ulu (island), Bismarck Archipelago, Papua New Guinea
Ulu, North Khorasan, a village in Iran
Ulu, Russia, a rural locality (a selo) in the Sakha Republic
Ulu, South Sudan, close to the Adar oilfield
Ulu Peninsula, Antarctica

Other uses
University of London Union
Uma’ Lasan language (ISO 639-3: ulu), a language of Borneo
A business founded by Paul Hembery

See also
Ulus (disambiguation)